The New Ground, Uxbridge Moor near Uxbridge, Middlesex was used as a venue for cricket matches between 1740 and 1790. It was an occasional home ground for Middlesex county cricket teams and by the local Uxbridge club and was used for two first-class cricket matches, one in 1789 and the other in 1790.

References

1740 establishments in England
Cricket grounds in Middlesex
Defunct cricket grounds in England
Defunct sports venues in London
English cricket venues in the 18th century
History of the London Borough of Hillingdon
History of Middlesex
Sport in the London Borough of Hillingdon
Sports venues completed in 1740
Uxbridge